Danilo De Girolamo (1 May 1956 – 9 May 2012) was an Italian actor and voice actor.

Biography
Born in Rome, De Girolamo began his career in Florence as an actor in the theatre during the 1980s and he participated in events such as Festival dei Due Mondi. He later went on to become a voice dubber. He was best known for voicing Remus Lupin (portrayed by David Thewlis) in the Italian dubbed broadcasts of the Harry Potter saga as well as James Norrington (portrayed by Jack Davenport) in the Pirates of the Caribbean films. De Girolamo was also a regular dubbing artist for Alan Cumming, Vincent Gallo and Ulrich Tukur.

In his animation roles, De Girolamo voiced Master Crane in the Italian dubs of the first two Kung Fu Panda movies, Delbert Doppler in Treasure Planet, Bear, Treelo, Ray the Sun, Jacques the Beaver, Big Old Bullfrog, Doc Hogg, Jeremiah Tortoise and Jack the Dog in Bear in the Big Blue House and he even voiced Guido in various foreign dubbed versions of Cars. For television, he dubbed Gustavo Fring (portrayed by Giancarlo Esposito) in Breaking Bad and Lorne (portrayed by Andy Hallett) in Angel. Other actors De Girolamo occasionally dubbed included Adam Sandler, Andy Dick, Johnny Depp, Tim Roth, Kenneth Branagh, Colin Firth and Guy Pearce.

From 2004 until his death in 2012, De Girolamo served as the President of the ANAD, which is a dubbing company based in Italy.

Death
De Girolamo died of a sudden heart attack on 9 May 2012, eight days after his 56th birthday.

Dubbing roles

Animation
Crane in Kung Fu Panda
Crane in Kung Fu Panda 2
Crane in Kung Fu Panda: Legends of Awesomeness (season 1)
Gurgle in Finding Nemo
Bear, Treelo and various characters in Bear in the Big Blue House
Dash in The Little Mermaid II: Return to the Sea
President Hathaway in Monsters vs. Aliens
Delbert Doppler in Treasure Planet
King Gator in All Dogs Go to Heaven
Pain in Hercules: Zero to Hero
Pain in Hercules: The Animated Series 
Pain / Timothy Q. Mouse in Disney's House of Mouse
Frugal Lucre in Kim Possible
Jeff Fungus in Monsters, Inc.
Martin Benson in Bee Movie
Guido in Cars (Various foreign dubbed versions)
Baby Gonzo in Cartoon All-Stars to the Rescue
Wallace in Wallace & Gromit: The Curse of the Were-Rabbit
Roy in Garfield and Friends
Dragon in Jane and the Dragon
Troubadour in Mickey, Donald, Goofy: The Three Musketeers
Roger Radcliffe (singing voice) in 101 Dalmatians II: Patch's London Adventure
Ling (singing voice) in Mulan II
Rollo in Valiant

Live action
Remus Lupin in Harry Potter and the Prisoner of Azkaban
Remus Lupin in Harry Potter and the Order of the Phoenix
Remus Lupin in Harry Potter and the Half-Blood Prince
Remus Lupin in Harry Potter and the Deathly Hallows – Part 1
Remus Lupin in Harry Potter and the Deathly Hallows – Part 2
James Norrington in Pirates of the Caribbean: The Curse of the Black Pearl
James Norrington in Pirates of the Caribbean: Dead Man's Chest
James Norrington in Pirates of the Caribbean: At World's End
Fegan Floop in Spy Kids
Fegan Floop in Spy Kids 2: The Island of Lost Dreams
Fegan Floop in Spy Kids 3-D: Game Over
Gustavo Fring in Breaking Bad
Eli Gold in The Good Wife (Ep. 1-61)
Loki in Son of the Mask
Boris Grishenko in GoldenEye
Lorne in Angel
Reggie Warrington in The Nutty Professor
David Langley in Bean - The Ultimate Disaster Movie
Jerry in Liar Liar
Bob in Birth
Heywood in The Shawshank Redemption
Mitch Roman in Patch Adams
Roger in Pulp Fiction
Rex in Airheads
Hillary in Lara Croft: Tomb Raider
Hillary in Lara Croft: Tomb Raider – The Cradle of Life
Mayor R. Brown in Yogi Bear
Dr. Brackish Okun in Independence Day
Patch Quatermain in Johnny English Reborn
Whitworth in 2 Fast 2 Furious
Paul Ashworth in Fever Pitch
Henry Swinton in A.I. Artificial Intelligence
Thomas Renfield in Dracula: Dead and Loving It
Berowne in Love's Labour's Lost
Harold Carvey in The Getaway
Oscar Choice in Armageddon
Ted Maltin in Jingle All the Way
Robbie Hart in The Wedding Singer
Bobby Boucher Jr. in The Waterboy
King Edward VIII in The King's Speech
Ralph Wyman in Short Cuts
Ollie Powers in Any Given Sunday
Dave Goldman in Bye Bye Love
Nate Pearson in Aliens in the Attic
Lars Smuntz in Mouse Hunt
Donnie in Transformers: Dark of the Moon
Archibald Cunningham in Rob Roy
Bon Bon / Lt. Víctor in Before Night Falls
Fra Pavel in The Golden Compass
Hal L. in Happy Gilmore

References

External links
 
 
 

1956 births
2012 deaths
Male actors from Rome
Italian male voice actors
Italian male stage actors
Italian voice directors
20th-century Italian male actors
21st-century Italian male actors